Dichagyris madida is a species of cutworm or dart moth in the family Noctuidae.

The MONA or Hodges number for Dichagyris madida is 10885.

References

Further reading

 
 
 

madida
Articles created by Qbugbot
Moths described in 1852